Kabagambe is a surname prevalent in Uganda. It may refer to:

Anne Kabagambe, Ugandan international development and finance executive
Joseph Kabagambe (born 1984), Ugandan footballer
Moïse Mugenyi Kabagambe, Congolese immigrant in Brazil

References